Actinopus caraiba is a species of mygalomorph spiders in the family Actinopodidae. It is found Venezuela.

References

caraiba
Spiders described in 1889